Stanley Livingstone Baxter (born 24 May 1926) is a Scottish actor, comedian, impressionist and author. Baxter began his career as a child actor on BBC Scotland and later became known for his British television comedy shows The Stanley Baxter Show, The Stanley Baxter Picture Show, The Stanley Baxter Series and Mr Majeika.

Baxter has also written a number of books based on Glasgow.

Early life
The son of an insurance manager, Baxter was born in Glasgow, Scotland. He was educated at Hillhead High School, Glasgow, and schooled for the stage by his mother. He began his career as a child actor in the Scottish edition of the BBC's Children's Hour. He developed his performing skills further during his national service with the British Army's Combined Services Entertainment unit, working alongside comedy actor Kenneth Williams, actor Peter Vaughan, film director John Schlesinger and dramatist Peter Nichols, who used the experience as the basis for his play Privates on Parade.

After the war, Baxter returned to Glasgow taking to the stage for three years at Glasgow's Citizens' Theatre. Following success on the radio with Jimmy Logan, Howard & Wyndham Ltd invited him to star in pantomime at the Theatre Royal in Glasgow followed by the Half Past Eight Shows, and their successors the Five Past Eight Shows at Glasgow's Alhambra Theatre. He moved to London to work in television in 1959.

In 1969, Baxter performed in the original production of Joe Orton's then controversial farce What the Butler Saw at the Queen's Theatre in the West End with Sir Ralph Richardson, Coral Browne and Hayward Morse. Baxter nurtured the stage careers of Alyson McInnes and John Ramage. Baxter remained a great favourite on the Scottish pantomime circuit, especially at the King's Theatre, Glasgow, up until his retirement in 1992. He starred, in pantomime, with popular Scottish stars, Jimmy Logan and Una McLean.

Radio
During the 1960s, Baxter had his own show on BBC Radio Scotland. In 1994 he returned to radio, taking the role of Noël Coward in the BBC World Service Play of the Week, Marvellous Party directed by Neil Cargill. Written by Jon Wynne-Tyson, it also starred Dorothy Tutin as Coward's lifelong friend, Esme Wynne-Tyson (Jon's mother). Also with Cargill, he read Whisky Galore and Jimmy Swan – The Joy Traveller for BBC Radio, providing the voices of all the characters.

After a lengthy spell in self-imposed retirement, he appeared in 2004 in a series of four half-hour radio sitcoms for BBC Radio 4, entitled Stanley Baxter and Friends; the success of this has led to further series entitled The Stanley Baxter Playhouse in 2006, 2008, 2009, 2010, 2013, 2014 and 2016, and Two Pipe Problems with Richard Briers in 2008, 2009 and 2010. Two further plays in this series were broadcast in 2013 with Geoffrey Palmer taking the Richard Briers role. In 2009 Eddie Izzard presented The Stanley Baxter Story on BBC Radio 2. A further series of 'Playhouse' commenced airing on BBC Radio 4 in November 2018.

Television
Baxter was known for his impressions of famous people, particularly The Queen (referred to in the context of the shows as 'the Duchess of Brendagh'). The Stanley Baxter Show ran between 1963 and 1971 on BBC One, and The Stanley Baxter Picture Show from 1972 to 1975 on ITV; the six-part Stanley Baxter Series was made by LWT in 1981. Eight one-hour TV specials were made by LWT and the BBC between 1973 and 1986.

Baxter guest-starred in an episode of The Goodies and later appeared in the lead role in Mr Majeika, developed from the books by Humphrey Carpenter, a children's show about a magic teacher, expelled from Walpurgis (the wizard land) for failing his professional examinations. He later stated that he had wanted to retire after his spectacular hour-long shows had been cancelled and that the move to children's television was a "purely financial" arrangement.

In Bing Crosby's final Christmas special, taped for CBS in the UK just a few weeks before Crosby's death in 1977, Baxter played multiple roles, including a butler, cook and – in one skit opposite a cracking-up Crosby – the ghost of Bob Hope's court jester ancestor. Having retired in 1990, Baxter returned for a one-off Christmas 2008 special for ITV, containing a mix of archived and new material, with celebrity comedians commenting on Baxter's influence on their lives and careers.

Film
Baxter appeared in a number of films, including Geordie (1955), Very Important Person (1961), The Fast Lady (1962), Crooks Anonymous (1962) and Father Came Too! (1963), the last four alongside James Robertson Justice, together with the animation The Thief and the Cobbler (1995).

Books
Baxter has written a number of books based on the language of Glasgow, as developed in his Parliamo Glasgow sketch, and on the humour of the city; 
Bedside Book of Glasgow Humour , may be same as 
Parliamo Glasgow Omnibus  and 
Let's Parliamo Glasgow Again – Merrorapattur 
Stanley Baxter's Suburban Shocker : Featuring Rosemary Morningside and the Garrulous Glaswegian Mr. Ballhead

Personal life
Baxter was brought up in the West End of Glasgow, in a tenement. He lived there from the age of five until he married actress Moira Robertson at 26 years of age. He later lived in Highgate, North London. He was married for 46 years until his wife's death in 1997 of an overdose while he was overseas.

In August 2014, Baxter was one of 200 public figures who were signatories to a letter to The Guardian expressing their hope that Scotland would vote to remain part of the United Kingdom in September's referendum on that issue.

In August 2020, Baxter came out as gay, following the release of his authorised biography. His biography described how Baxter had told Moira that he was gay before they married, with Baxter having sought to end their relationship as a result, but that she had threatened suicide, causing him to relent. Moira accepted that he was gay and allowed him to bring men home for sex, despite homosexual acts being illegal in England and Wales until the passing of the Sexual Offences Act 1967 16 years after their marriage. Five years before then, Baxter had been arrested for cottaging and contemplated suicide for fear of scandal causing an end to his career. The soliciting charges were subsequently dropped.

Baxter sought to maintain the secrecy around his sexual orientation, with his biography describing how he had taken legal action over the posthumous publication of Kenneth Williams' diaries after Williams, a long-time friend, died in 1988. In his biography, Baxter describes his discomfort with his homosexuality: "Anybody would be insane to choose to live such a very difficult life. There are many gay people these days who are fairly comfortable with their sexuality, fairly happy with who they are. I’m not. I never wanted to be gay. I still don’t."

Awards
 BAFTA Award for Light Entertainment Artist (1960)
 BAFTA Award for Light Entertainment Performance (1975) for the Stanley Baxter Moving Picture Show
 BAFTA Scotland Award for Outstanding Contribution (2020)
 Lifetime Achievement Award (British Comedy Awards) (1997)
 Oldie Camper of the Year – For continuing to endear and delight his audiences with original comic material by The Oldie magazine (2008)

Baxter was offered, but declined, an OBE.

DVD releases
All six of Baxter's hour-long ITV specials were released on a two-disc DVD set in 2005 as The Stanley Baxter Collection with a further two-disc DVD set being released in 2006 under the title The Stanley Baxter Series & Picture Show featuring both of his series of half-hour shows for ITV. In 2008 a five-disc DVD box set was released titled The Stanley Baxter Television Set. The set includes both half-hour ITV series that Baxter made for ITV and six of his ITV specials. It also includes two of the feature films he made with James Robertson Justice The Fast Lady and Father Came Too!.

List of film and television appearances

Stanley Baxter TV series
 The Stanley Baxter Show (BBC, 22 x 30-minutes, 1963–71)
 Baxter On... (BBC, 1964)
 Time For Baxter (BBC Scotland, 1972)
 The Stanley Baxter Picture Show (LWT – four x 30-minutes, 1972)
 The Stanley Baxter Series (LWT – six x 30-minutes, 1981)

Stanley Baxter TV specials
 The Stanley Baxter Big Picture Show (LWT – 21 December 1973)
 The Stanley Baxter Scots Picture Show (STV – 1 January 1974)
 The Stanley Baxter Moving Picture Show (LWT – 7 September 1974)
 The Best of Baxter (LWT – 14 December 1974)
 The Stanley Baxter Show Part III (LWT – 19 September 1975)
 Stanley Baxter’s Christmas Box (LWT – 26 December 1976)
 Stanley Baxter's Greatest Hits (LWT – 26 December 1977)
 Stanley Baxter on Television (LWT – 1 April 1979)
 The Stanley Baxter Hour (LWT – 24 December 1982)
 Stanley Baxter's Christmas Hamper (BBC, 1985)
 Stanley Baxter's Television Annual (BBC, 1986)
 Stanley Baxter is Back (C4, 1995)
 Stanley Baxter in Reel Terms (C4, 1996)
 Stanley Baxter in Person (Carlton, 1998)
 Stanley Baxter Now and Then (ITV, 2008)

Other TV appearances
Shop Window (BBC, 1952)
This is Scotland (STV, 1957)
On The Bright Side (BBC, 1960)
Comedy Playhouse: "Lunch in the Park" (BBC, 1961)
Espionage (BBC, 1963 Guest Appearance)
Wednesday Play: "The Confidence Course" (BBC, 1965)
Christmas Night with the Stars (BBC, 1970, Guest Appearance)
The Goodies (BBC, 1971 Guest Appearance)
A Grand Tour (STV, 1974)
Bing Crosby's Merrie Olde Christmas (CBS/ITC Entertainment, 1977 Guest Appearances as multiple characters)
Mr Majeika (Television South, 1988–90, Title Role)
Rab C. Nesbitt (BBC, 1991, Guest Appearance)
Arabian Knight (Animation, 1995, Voice Only)
Meeow (Animation, 2000, Voice Only)
The Unforgettable...Kenneth Williams (Carlton, 2001, Interviewee)
The Sketch Show Story (BBC, 2001, Interviewee)
EX:SThis is Stanley Baxter (BBC, 2001 75th Birthday Documentary)
Return of the Goodies (BBC, 2005, Interviewee)
The Story of Light Entertainment (BBC, 2006, Interviewee)
Comedy Map of Britain (BBC, 2007, Interviewee)
Happy Birthday BAFTA (2007, Guest)
The Comedy Christmas (2007, Interviewee)
Artwork Scotland:When Alan Cumming met Stanley Baxter (2010)
The Many Faces of Stanley Baxter (2013)
Scottish Television Hogmanay shows (1980s and 1990s)
Road To Londonderry
The Undiscovered Kenneth Williams (Associated-Rediffusion/Sky Arts, 2018, Interviewee)
Comedy National Treasures: Stanley Baxter (Associated-Rediffusion/Channel 5, 2019, Subject/Interviewee)

Films
Geordie (Film, 1955)
Very Important Person (Rank, 1961)
The Fast Lady (Rank, 1962)
Crooks Anonymous (Film, 1962)
Father Came Too! (Rank, 1963)
Joey Boy (Film, 1965)
The Thief and the Cobbler (Animation, Voice Only, 1993)

References

External links
Teletronic.co.uk

Stanley Baxter biography and credits at BFI Screenonline
Parliamo Glasgow audio clip from BBC Radio Scotland
 

1926 births
20th-century Scottish comedians
21st-century Scottish comedians
Living people
Best Entertainment Performance BAFTA Award (television) winners
British Army personnel of World War II
British male television writers
Comedians from Glasgow
Entertainments National Service Association personnel
Scottish gay actors
Scottish gay writers
Gay comedians
Scottish LGBT entertainers
Pantomime dames
People educated at Hillhead High School
Scottish comedy writers
Scottish impressionists (entertainers)
Scottish male comedians
Scottish male film actors
Scottish male radio actors
Scottish male stage actors
Scottish male television actors
Scottish television writers
British LGBT comedians